Neochromadora is a genus of nematodes belonging to the family Chromadoridae.

The genus has almost cosmopolitan distribution.

Species:

Neochromadora aberrans 
Neochromadora alatocarpa 
Neochromadora alatocorpa 
Neochromadora alejandroi 
Neochromadora amembranata 
Neochromadora angelica 
Neochromadora appiana 
Neochromadora bilineata 
Neochromadora bonita 
Neochromadora brevisetosa 
Neochromadora calathifera 
Neochromadora complexa 
Neochromadora coudenhovei 
Neochromadora craspedota 
Neochromadora edentata 
Neochromadora izhorica 
Neochromadora lateralis 
Neochromadora lineata 
Neochromadora munita 
Neochromadora nicolae 
Neochromadora nitida 
Neochromadora notocraspedota 
Neochromadora orientalis 
Neochromadora oshoroana 
Neochromadora papillosa 
Neochromadora paratecta 
Neochromadora poecilosoma 
Neochromadora poecilosoma 
Neochromadora poecilosomoides 
Neochromadora pugilator 
Neochromadora sabulicola 
Neochromadora tecta 
Neochromadora torquata 
Neochromadora trichophora 
Neochromadora trilineata

References

Nematodes